Mohamed Lamine Chakhari (born 1957) is a Tunisian politician. He serves as the Minister of Industry under Prime Minister Hamadi Jebali.

Biography

Early life
Mohamed Lamine Chakhari was born on 17 May 1957 in Foussana. He received a PhD in Mechanical engineering.

Career and politics
He works as a university professor at the National School of Engineers of Tunis. He is also the chief executive officer of an industrial company and the head of its mechanical engineering department. He is a member of the Ennahda Movement.

Minister
On 20 December 2011, after former President Zine El Abidine Ben Ali was deposed, he joined the Jebali Cabinet as Minister of Industry and Commerce. On 16 February 2012, he became Minister of Industry only, and his former deputy minister, Bechir Zaafouri, became Minister of Trade and Handicraft.

In May 2012, he announced that natural gas lines would reach the governorates of Kasserine, Siliana, Jendouba, Beja, and El Kef in Northwestern Tunisia. In June 2012, he unveiled a $2.5 billion investment strategy in solar energy for the Société Tunisienne de l'Electricité et du Gaz (STEG).

References

Living people
1957 births
Tunisian Muslims
Government ministers of Tunisia
People from Kasserine Governorate
Ennahda politicians